Very is the fifth studio album by English synth-pop duo Pet Shop Boys, released on 27 September 1993 by Parlophone, nearly three years after the duo's previous studio album, Behaviour, and following the compilation album Discography: The Complete Singles Collection. Very exhibits one of many turning points the Pet Shop Boys would make to their music, shifting from the subdued electronic pop of Behaviour to richly instrumented dance arrangements. The content and lyrics led to Very being called their "coming-out" album, since it was during this time that Neil Tennant had publicly discussed his long-rumoured homosexuality.

Background and release

The album Behaviour, released in 1990, although critically well-received, was commercially not as successful as their previous releases. In particular, the second single released, "Being Boring", which the duo had considered one of their strongest tracks, did not perform well on the UK charts, peaking at number 20 in November 1990. The subsequent Performance Tour which began in North America during Spring 1991 initially received mixed reviews in the United States and did not improve the poor showing of the album in the US charts, which only managed a peak of 45 on the US Billboard Album Charts. Journalist and close friend of the duo Chris Heath documented the American leg of the tour in his book Pet Shop Boys Versus America, at one point noting Chris Lowe's comment of "We should write another good dance album, write Behaviour off as a tax loss".

After the Performance Tour of 1991, Pet Shop Boys elected to take a break, releasing their compilation Discography: The Complete Singles Collection that November. This initially led some to believe that the group were close to breaking up, particularly as the group were no longer perceived at the peak of their popularity after their initial "golden period" in the mid to late 1980s.

When interviewed in 2006 for the documentary Pet Shop Boys: A Life In Pop, EMI representative Tony Wadsworth noted that when the record label first heard the songs on Very, "the smiles undoubtedly lit up the room [...] the songs were so obviously commercial." The promotion of Very was to include, for the first time, music videos that made use of the CGI available at the time and thus would guarantee more airplay on channels like MTV.

A limited edition of Very was also released as a double album titled Very Relentless. The second disc, Relentless, is a six-track dance album containing tracks that are more experimental and instrumental. There were plans to expand upon Relentless in 1994 by releasing the six tracks along with others, making a full dance album, but this evolved into Disco 2. The six tracks on Relentless have not been released elsewhere since (though "Forever in Love" is found on Very/Further Listening 1992–1994 in a remixed edited form as track 2). "Forever in Love" uses the same sample as "One Love" by The Prodigy, "Arabic Chant (Allah)" from the Zero-G sample library compilation Datafile One.

The album was reissued in 1996 as a mid-price release, this time in a standard jewel case with a new sleeve showing an image of the original case.

Very was re-released on 3 July 2001 (as were most of the group's studio albums up to that point) titled Very/Further Listening 1992–1994. The reissue was digitally remastered and included a second disc featuring B-sides and previously unreleased material. The unreleased songs were recorded during the Very recording sessions, but Tennant and Lowe decided not to include them on the album originally.

On 9 February 2009, the album was re-released yet again, still remastered, under the title Very: Remastered, but this time containing only the 12 original tracks.

To date, Very is the Pet Shop Boys' most commercially successful album in the UK; it reached number one on the UK Albums Chart shortly after its release. In addition, all singles released from the album entered the top 20 of the UK Singles Chart, including "Go West", which remains one of the duo's highest-charting singles. In contrast, however, the album and singles failed to achieve high chart positions on the Billboard Hot 100 in the United States (with the exception of those charting on the dance charts); this was seen partly as a result of the rise of grunge and alternative rock on American radio.

Packaging
The original release of Very was packaged in a unique orange jewel case with raised bumps (sometimes unofficially described as the Lego case), designed by Daniel Weil of Pentagram in London. Very Relentless was similarly unique, with the two CDs housed in card sleeves (Very in orange and Relentless in pink) with both of these housed in a translucent rubber case with raised bumps.

The case for Very was featured in the 1995 Museum of Modern Art (MoMA) exhibition "Mutant Materials in Contemporary Design."

Critical reception

Writing for NME, David Quantick deemed Very "brilliant from start to finish" and "as moving and moved as any other Pet Shop Boys album, just more obviously so", noting a shift from the "melancholy" of Behaviour towards "a sense of, gulp, happiness." In Select, Stuart Maconie speculated that the album's "more lively" musical direction may have been motivated by the "muted" reception to Behaviour, and commented that "Verys beauty lies in the formidable yet effortless plate-spinning trick that lets gorgeous and vibrant pop tunes co-exist with rich, strange and complex conceits." Mat Snow of Q, meanwhile, wrote that Very confirms the Pet Shop Boys as "a group so tightly focused on its strengths to the exclusion of any meaningful experiment that it drives a coach and horses through the First Commandment of Pop, namely 'Thou Shalt Explore a New Direction on Every Album'."

Chicago Tribune critic Greg Kot opined that "Very qualifies as terrific pop on the strength of its music alone", and that "as its gay worldview unfolds—unapologetic yet unassuming, humorous yet touching, political yet personal—Very takes on the dimensions of a classic." J. D. Considine, reviewing Very for Rolling Stone, highlighted the social commentary and "mixed emotions" in its songs, concluding that "it's that sort of depth that makes Very worth hearing again and again." Entertainment Weeklys Greg Sandow considered the album "very understated musically" but also "very deeply felt", while The Village Voices Robert Christgau found that Tennant's lyrics showed a newfound romantic sincerity: "Convinced cornballs may still find his emotions attenuated, but I say the production values suit the tumult in his heart and the melodies the sweetness in his soul." Less impressed was Dennis Hunt of the Los Angeles Times, who said that Very "is listenable and danceable, but overall it sounds as if their creativity has petered out—they're recycling these days rather than creating."

In the 2004 Rolling Stone Album Guide, Tom Hull noted that Very was released to more uniformly positive reviews from critics than Behaviour, which he attributed to its more uptempo sound and "unusually direct" love songs, "with most making more sense gay than not." AllMusic's Stephen Thomas Erlewine stated in retrospect that "Very is one of their very best records, expertly weaving between the tongue-in-cheek humor of 'I Wouldn't Normally Do This Kind of Thing,' the quietly shocking 'Can You Forgive Her?,' and the bizarrely moving cover of the Village People's 'Go West.'"

In June 2000, Q placed Very at number 91 on its list of "The 100 Greatest British Albums Ever". The album was also included in the book 1001 Albums You Must Hear Before You Die.

Track listing

Notes
  signifies additional music and lyrics

Personnel
Credits adapted from the liner notes of Very.

Pet Shop Boys
 Neil Tennant – vocals , keyboards , additional lyrics 
 Chris Lowe – keyboards , backing vocals , additional lyrics , lead vocals

Additional musicians
 Pete Gleadall – programming
 Anne Dudley – orchestra arrangement and conducting 
 Phil Todd, Chris Davis, John Barclay, John Thirkell, Mark Nightingale – brass 
 Richard Niles – brass arrangement, choir arrangement, additional keyboard arrangement 
 J.J. Belle – guitar 
 Frank Ricotti – percussion 
 Sylvia Mason-James – additional vocals 
 Dainton Connell – additional vocals 
 Carol Kenyon – additional vocals 
 Katie Kissoon – additional vocals 
 Tessa Niles – additional vocals 
 Joanna Wyatt, Thomas Rogers, Laurie Smith, Jody Smith, Nigel Francis, Francis Hatson, Lee Harris, Lucy Clark, Marie-Claire Peterson, Victoria Ferher – choir 
 Scott Altman, James Bassi, Hugh Berberich, Rodne Brown, Maurizio Corbino, Martin Doner, Dan Egan, James Gandre, Paul Houghtaling, Michael Hume, Robert Kuehn, Drew Martin, Joseph Nelson Neal, Mark Rehnstrom, Steven Tachell, Frank Nemhauser (with thanks to Graeme Perkins and Jaqueline Pierce) – choir

Technical
 Pet Shop Boys – production
 Stephen Hague – additional production, mixing
 Brothers in Rhythm – additional production 
 Mike "Spike" Drake – mixing
 Bob Kraushaar – engineering, vocal recording
 Pete Gleadall – engineering
 Sam Hardaker, Richard Lowe, Howard Bargroff, Robin Barclay – engineering assistance

Artwork
 Mark Farrow – graphic design
 Pet Shop Boys – graphic design
 Chris Nash – photographs
 David Fielding – costume and set design
 Pentagram – CD packaging, concept, design

Charts

Weekly charts

Year-end charts

Certifications and sales

Notes

References

External links
 1993 interview with Daniel Weil, designer of the Very package.

1993 albums
Albums produced by Stephen Hague
Parlophone albums
Pet Shop Boys albums